Sirakov is a Bulgarian masculine surname, its feminine counterpart is Sirakova. It may refer to
Ivan Sirakov (born 1988), Bulgarian orienteering competitor
Nasko Sirakov (born 1962), Bulgarian football striker
Petko Sirakov (born 1929), Bulgarian wrestler 
Volodya Sirakov (born 1953), Bulgarian Olympic water polo player
Zahari Sirakov (born 1977), Bulgarian football player
Rumen Sirakov (born 1941), Bulgarian musician and tambura player

Bulgarian-language surnames